The Accelerated Dragon (or Accelerated Fianchetto) is a chess opening variation of the Sicilian Defence that begins with the moves:

1. e4 c5
2. Nf3 Nc6
3. d4 cxd4
4. Nxd4 g6

The Accelerated Dragon features an early ...g6 by Black. An important difference between this line and the Dragon is that Black avoids playing ...d7–d6 so that ...d7–d5 can be played later in one move, if possible. Black also avoids the Yugoslav Attack, but since White has not yet played Nc3, 5.c4 (the Maróczy Bind) is possible.

The Accelerated Dragon generally features a more  style of play than in many other lines of the Sicilian.

Main line

One of the main lines continues: 5. Nc3 Bg7 6. Be3 Nf6 7. Bc4 (diagram), when the most important Black continuations are 7...0-0 and 7...Qa5. White should not castle  after 7...Qa5, unlike in the Yugoslav Attack.

7...0-0 is the main line, after which White should proceed with 8.Bb3. If Black plays 8...d6, White usually continues 9.f3 as in the Yugoslav Attack. Black often plays 8...a5 or 8...Qa5, however, after which castling queenside can be dangerous, and it is often a better idea for White to castle .

Passmore Variation

Another common line seen in tournaments continues: 5. Nxc6 bxc6 6. Qd4 Nf6 7. e5 Ng8 (7...Nd5 works as well) 8. e6 Nf6 9. exf7+ Kxf7 (diagram), when both sides have  chances. Black defends easily, however, with 10...d5 or 10...e6, resulting in a position where his king is safe. Both players can choose to play positionally or otherwise will have variable results. Statistically, White's best continuation is 10.Be2 followed with 11.0-0.

See also
 Sicilian Defence (including )
 Sicilian Defence, Dragon Variation

References

Bibliography

Further reading

Understanding The Accelerated Sicilian Dragon B36
The Accelerated Dragon, by GM Eugene Perelshteyn
A weakness in the Accelerated Dragon

Chess openings